Thomas J. Stapleton, Jr. (born January 6, 1947) is an American politician from Pennsylvania who served as a Democratic member of the Pennsylvania House of Representatives for the 165th district from 1975 to 1978.

Early life and education
Stapleton was born in Philadelphia, Pennsylvania and graduated from Monsignor Bonner High School.  He received a B.A. in political science from Niagara University in 1968 and a J.D. from Villanova University School of Law in 1972.

Career
Stapleton was elected to the Pennsylvania House of Representative for the 165th district and served from 1975 to 1978.  He had an unsuccessful candidacy for reelection to the House in 1979 losing to Mary Ann Arty.

References

1947 births
20th-century American politicians
Living people
Democratic Party members of the Pennsylvania House of Representatives
Niagara University alumni
Pennsylvania lawyers
Villanova University School of Law alumni
Politicians from Philadelphia